

List of municipalities in Cambodia by population 
The figures listed in the table below come from the 2018 Commune Database (CDB) published by the National Committee for Sub-National Democratic Development (NCDD). These data are recorded differently to Cambodian census data and significant variations are to be expected between the two due to internal and external migration. The national census does not record population by city, rather by province. The only available method of estimating the population of a city is through the CDB, which is updated every two years.

For instance, the 2018 CDB suggests that 1,474,489 people were living in Phnom Penh municipality, whereas the 2019 census (which only preliminary results have been released for) suggests 2,129,371.

The figures listed in the table below are based on the most recently published Commune Database. However, the population in Phnom Penh and other major urban centers, such as Siem Reap, Battambang, and Sihanoukville will be underestimated; while the population in smaller provincial municipalities, particularly those on the border with Thailand, Laos and Vietnam, will be overestimated. The most accurate information is available in the 2019 census, which provides information on the de facto population i.e. the precise population at the time the census was recorded, rather than official data recorded in Commune offices. To date, no information disaggregated by city is available from any census.

The size of municipal populations is based upon the municipal area and there are other smaller urbanized towns in Cambodia with significant populations, which are part of larger districts, such as Poipet in Banteay Meanchey province. It is not really possible to estimate the population of these urban areas using the CDB.

Cities

See also 
 Administrative divisions of Cambodia

References 

 
Cambodia, List of cities in
Cities